The Knoydart Formation is a geologic formation in Nova Scotia. It preserves fossils dating back to the Devonian period.

See also

 List of fossiliferous stratigraphic units in Nova Scotia

References
 

Devonian Nova Scotia
Devonian southern paleotemperate deposits